Through the Morning, Through the Night is the second and final album from the country rock duo Dillard & Clark, released in 1969.

Background
The musicians included country rock and folk rock pioneers Gene Clark, Doug Dillard, Bernie Leadon, Chris Hillman, Sneaky Pete Kleinow, Byron Berline and Michael Clarke. However, the addition of Dillard's girlfriend Donna Washburn as a full-time harmony vocalist (and lead vocalist on "Rocky Top"), replacing Leadon, caused Leadon to leave the group and join Hillman, Clarke and Kleinow in the Flying Burrito Brothers, although he, Hillman and Kleinow appear as "special pickers" on the album.

The core band on this album included Clark, Dillard, Washburn, David Jackson, fiddler Byron Berline and drummer Jon Corneal, who had quit the Burritos, which made room for Clarke to join them. The large number of cover songs included on the album caused critical reaction to be decidedly less positive than on the prior album. As a result, Gene Clark also left the band after the album. Although Doug Dillard tried to continue the group as the Doug Dillard Expedition, the group soon came to an end.

The tracks "Through the Morning, Through the Night" and "Polly" were covered by Alison Krauss and Robert Plant on their 2007 collaboration Raising Sand.

Reception

Music critic Richie Unterberger, writing for Allmusic, called the album "a disappointment in relation to their far more eclectic and original prior effort, The Fantastic Expedition of Dillard & Clark. The primary difference is that whereas the earlier record had leaned on Gene Clark's original compositions, and a reasonably adventurous attitude toward country-rock fusion in general, the follow-up saw them turning into a much more traditional folk/bluegrass act... Taken on its own, it's a fair, pleasant, heavily bluegrass-flavored outing with few surprises."

Track listing
"No Longer a Sweetheart of Mine" (Don Reno, Red Smiley, Fred Swift) – 3:16
"Through the Morning, Through the Night" (Gene Clark) – 4:06
"Rocky Top" (Boudleaux Bryant, Felice Bryant) – 2:47
"So Sad" (Don Everly, Phil Everly) – 3:21
"Corner Street Bar" (Gene Clark) – 3:35
"I Bowed My Head and Cried Holy" (Traditional; arranged by Dillard & Clark) – 3:33
"Kansas City Southern" (Gene Clark) – 3:40
"Four Walls" (George Campbell, Marvin J. Moore) – 3:40
"Polly" (Gene Clark) – 4:22
"Roll in My Sweet Baby's Arms" (Bill Monroe) – 2:50
"Don't Let Me Down" (John Lennon, Paul McCartney) – 3:52

Personnel
Gene Clark - vocals, guitar, harmonica
Doug Dillard - vocals, banjo, guitar, fiddle  
Byron Berline - fiddle
Donna Washburn - guitar, tambourine, vocals
David Jackson - bass, piano, cello, vocals
Sneaky Pete Kleinow - pedal steel guitar
Bernie Leadon - guitar, bass
Chris Hillman - mandolin
Jon Corneal - drums, tambourine
Michael Clarke - drums  (questionable)

Production
Producer: Larry Marks
Recording Engineers: Dick Bogert & Ray Gerhardt
Art Direction: Tom Wilkes
Photography: Jim McCrary
Liner notes: Barry Ballard

References

1969 albums
A&M Records albums
Dillard & Clark albums